is a Japanese football player.

Club statistics

References

External links

j-league

1987 births
Living people
Tokai Gakuen University alumni
Association football people from Kagoshima Prefecture
Japanese footballers
J2 League players
FC Gifu players
Kochi United SC players
Association football defenders